Back in the Red is the opening three-part episode of series VIII of science fiction sit-com Red Dwarf. Part 1 was first broadcast on the British television channel BBC2 on 18 February 1999 followed by Part 2 on 25 February and Part 3 on 4 March.

The plot involves the re-introduction of Red Dwarf, as nanobots have rebuilt the ship and the original crew are resurrected. The three episodes were written by Doug Naylor and directed by Ed Bye.

Plot

Part 1
In a cell, Lister and Rimmer are having another furious argument. We are then shown the circumstances that led to their incarceration...

Three days earlier, Kryten's nanobots had rebuilt Red Dwarf, but done so far too large. Lister enters the cockpit, showing off his now non-muscular body, and it emerges that the enlargement is a temporary symptom of the nanobots' restoration process, as it soon turns out that Red Dwarf is shrinking around Starbug. Suddenly, the ship is sucked into an air vent. With Red Dwarf almost completely shrunk, the corridors rip off the rear and middle section of Starbug before the cockpit is sent flying into a cargo bay where it crash-lands, and the crew manage to escape mere seconds before it explodes.

The crew are approached by two figures recognised by Lister... Selby and Chen. The nanobots have not only restored Red Dwarf but also its crew. Captain Hollister then arrives with a Security Officer who places Lister under arrest for stealing and crashing a Starbug, flying without a pilot's licence and bringing two stowaways (The Cat and Kryten) aboard. Everyone is placed in custody and Lister is confined to quarters. He then asks Holly (who is still loaded into Lister's watch and therefore hidden from the crew of Red Dwarf) what will happen if they are found guilty. Holly explains that they will get two years in the brig. Lister is confused, as Red Dwarf does not have a brig, but Holly explains that there is a top-secret prison facility contained aboard the ship, holding hundreds of inmates who were being transported to a containment facility. Unfortunately, they have all been resurrected too.

Just as he thinks things cannot get any worse, Rimmer enters the bunkroom. However, this is not the Rimmer that left Starbug to take on his alter-egopersona of Ace, but rather the Rimmer that was aboard Red Dwarf before the accident that wiped out the crew. Lister tells Rimmer the whole story and asks for help in escaping. In exchange, he offers Rimmer a copy of the crew's personal and confidential files that exist on Starbug. Rimmer initially refuses, until Lister tells him that with the information, he can get the promotion to officer status like he has always wanted. Rimmer agrees and Lister gives him his watch which Holly has been loaded into.

The Cat and Kryten are taken for medical and psychiatric evaluation. Unfortunately, Kryten's erratic personality does not go over well, and he is recommended to be restored to his factory settings.

Aboard the burnt out wreckage of the cockpit of Starbug, Rimmer finds the disc with the crew's files. He also finds two strange tubes that are the positive viruses that Lister picked up from a Dr. Hildegarde Lanstrom, years earlier. Rimmer quickly tries out sexual magnetism, and walks down the corridor where all the women admire him. Rimmer notes to himself that 'the world loves a bastard'.

Part 2
Lister, Kochanski, Kryten and The Cat are brought before a board of enquiry, and Captain Hollister requests their permission to use psychotropic testing during their trial. The four agree and Captain Hollister asks them to sign a letter of consent each and place them in envelopes provided. Later, Kryten is taken away for a physical examination and, due to his lack of a penis, is classified as a woman. They also offer Kryten a deal: if he agrees to undergo a system restoration, then the charges against him will be dropped. Kryten does not want to say yes, but cannot say no to superior officers. Kochanski tells Kryten to imagine the officers sitting on the toilet to help him; Kryten finds it works, then imagines Kochanski sitting on a toilet for his own amusement.

Later, Rimmer visits Captain Hollister with a report detailing the dangers of loose drive plates. Hollister is impressed by the in-depth report, and Rimmer (using information from the confidential reports) continues by giving Hollister a blueberry muffin as an anniversary present and some pile cream. Hollister gives Rimmer an envelope and asks him to post it; Rimmer seals the envelope before noticing that it is addressed to him. Hollister tells Rimmer that he is inviting him to the Captain's Table that evening. Rimmer cannot believe how well the scheme is working and visits Lister in his cell. However, Rimmer has decided to end the deal to help Lister escape, and has copied the confidential reports, meaning Lister does not have to supply him with the information. Rimmer then tells Lister that he has the positive viruses and intends to use them. He leaves, but does not realise that Lister has managed to expose himself to the luck virus, which he uses to guess the codes needed to escape the cell.

Kryten is asked for his decision regarding getting his corrupted systems repaired, and the mechanoid still cannot say no. In order to give him the courage, he steals a security guard's gun and (taking Kochanski's advice too seriously) and forces the superior officers present to sit on toilets with their pants down. Amused by this, Kryten finally refuses to have his systems restored; however, his actions have caused the crew to decide to proceed anyway. Afterwards, Kryten has been returned to his old ways of servitude and politeness. Lister breaks Kochanski out of her quarters and, while in the lift, decides to make the most of the opportunity to try out the sexual magnetism virus on himself. Although it works at first and Kochanski practically throws herself at her former boyfriend, she returns to normal after a few seconds and Lister realises that the positive viruses cancel each other out. Later, after getting The Cat released, the three look for Kryten so they can all escape, only to discover that he does not recognise them and has returned to his factory settings. Lister, Kochanski and The Cat start looking for a new disguise (since The Cat refuses to wear anything over his over his normal clothes). Suddenly, The Cat hits on a great idea...with black mop- heads and fake teeth with overbites, they can pretend to be the Dibbley family.

At dinner, Rimmer has taken the sexual magnetism virus in a very large dose and charms everyone. While the women look at him adoringly, Rimmer impresses Hollister with his theories on future echoes and universes where time runs backwards. Rimmer soon finds the sexual magnetism virus is not so great, as every time he gets up to fetch refreshments, a female guest follows him and forces him to have sex with her.

Lister, Kochanski and The Cat are bluffing their way past the crew with their geeky disguises and claim to be computer programmers when they run into Kryten again, who begins to recognise them. Knowing that recognising them will cause him to feel happy while also exposing them to the danger of being discovered, Kryten feels ambivalence, an emotion he was trying to master before. This undoes the system restoration and his settings return to normal. The four continue their escape from the ship.

After yet another sexual encounter, Hollister discusses the psychotropic testing he is conducting on the others and reveals that Lister and the others merely believe they are escaping when they are really in an artificial reality where their actions are being monitored. Rimmer realises that Lister could end up mentioning the deal they had regarding the confidential files, and land him in a heap of trouble; thus he excuses himself and scrambles to the AR suite. On his journey, he decides to try to regain some of his self-control and injects his groin with anaesthetic. However, it spreads to his left leg, and he is forced to hobble to the Artificial Reality suite while the female crew still admire him.

Part 3
Lister, Kryten, Kochanski and The Cat make it (or rather, they think they have made it) to a holding bay and sneak aboard Blue Midget; however, the attractive controller tells The Cat he needs clearance. In order to prove that he is capable of handling the ship, as well as impressing the woman, he begins an impromptu dance routine with Blue Midget as his partner. Amazingly, this ploy works and the flight controller agrees to a date with The Cat who is more than ready to stay behind and get ready, before Lister forces them to leave.

Rimmer reaches the Artificial Reality suite, and blackmails the officer on duty into leaving, using the confidential information. In the simulation, the crew begin their search for the nanobots. Lister then begins to discuss the deal he made with Rimmer; however, Rimmer begins to edit out all mention of his name and the agreement. The crew, in the simulation, notice the jumps in their actions and conversation and realise that the whole escape attempt is a simulation designed to test their responses (having been knocked out when they licked the envelopes at the earlier hearing). Lister realises that they have actually proved their innocence, as they have indeed been trying to track down the nanobots who resurrected the crew. Rimmer, desperate to protect himself, then begins more edits to make Lister and the others seem guilty. Deciding they need to get out of the simulation, the crew search for the emergency exit which is hidden by a cryptic clue. Amazingly, the Cat is the one to work out that the button marked 'E-Eleven-T' is the trap door (as eleven is XI in Roman numerals). Pressing the button, the four then find themselves as plasticine characters trapped in the simulation's screen saver. The Cat once again finds the emergency exit (in the form of a ketchup bottle, or "power source"), and the four leave again.

The crew wake in the Artificial Reality suite to find Rimmer trying furiously to place them back inside; however, he is quickly on the run as the sexual magnetism virus causes Kochanski to lust after him. Hobbling to the lift, Rimmer is protected from her advances by the others while Lister tells him that taking the luck virus will cure the sexual magnetism virus. Thanks to this, Rimmer, his leg and an embarrassed Kochanski are returned to normal. The crew are now forced to take Rimmer with them as they make a real escape attempt.

The five make it to Blue Midget and once again, a flight controller demands clearance, and this one is far from attractive. The Cat decides to forgo the dance and Blue Midget leaves the ship in a hurry. While making plans to pick up supplies from the SS Einstein, talk turns to the Theory of relativity. Naturally Holly is unable to recall what it actually means, but takes offence at being labelled an idiot and reveals that he created the nanobots that resurrected the crew! He explains that ever since he brought Lister out of stasis, he has had one directive: to keep Lister sane, which he does by finding distractions and ways to keep him occupied. Everyone is shocked that Holly nearly got them thrown in the brig, but Holly tells them they still might end up there...everyone is still in Artificial Reality and so is Rimmer.

From his office, Captain Hollister discusses the events with the original version of Holly who has an IQ of 6,000. It turns out that the Captain suspected Rimmer of being in league with Lister and the others, when he came to his office with so much knowledge and had him lick one of the psychotropic envelopes when he invited him to the Captain's table. Lister and the others are found not guilty of the charges against them based on their actions in the Artificial Reality suite...but now have a new charge brought against them; using confidential information for their own gain. Of this, everyone is found guilty and are sentenced to two years in the brig. The five are released from Artificial Reality and realise they still have the positive viruses (since they have not really been used), only for Captain Hollister to confiscate the luck virus to send for testing. As they are photographed in their prison uniforms, Holly realises that he has buggered up again.

Below, the crew are welcomed by Warden Ackerman to 'The Tank'. While this is going on, Lister – still in possession of the sexual magnetism virus – empties the tube over Rimmer as revenge for his actions earlier. Rimmer then realises that he is becoming very popular with the male inmates.

Production
For series VIII, Doug Naylor returned to the roots of Red Dwarf and would write the majority of the series himself. Paul Alexander – whose episodes "Stoke Me a Clipper" and "Epideme" were well received – returned as script supervisor.

The inspiration for the new series came about during Naylor's work on the remastering of series I to III. The classic bunk set-up and the character of Captain Hollister in those early episodes proved to be a deciding factor in reviving the crew.

The opening episode was originally planned as an hour-long special. This would give the series the opportunity to introduce the new set-up. However, the episode over-ran and the opener turned into a three-part story.

Having the crew revived meant having the original actors back. Mac McDonald reprised his Captain Hollister character; Paul Bradley and David Gillespie returned as Lister's respective drinking buddies, Chen and Selby. Andy Taylor played Counsellor McClaren, the ship's psychiatrist; Karl Glenn Stimpson played MP Thornton; and Kika Mirylees appeared as CMO Karen Newton.

Red Dwarf, the ship itself, also returned, having not been seen since "Demons and Angels", the penultimate feature of series V. A new, much larger model had been created for the Remastered project, though it ended up being too difficult to film because of its size. As a result, the model was used as a template for a CGI version of the ship, which was used not only for the Remastered project, but also series VIII. The large model was later modified, and finally seen on-screen in Red Dwarf X.

With Kryten having been defaulted to his factory settings, posh English accent and all, it was considered that David Ross could make a return. Ross had first played the character in the Series II episode "Kryten" as a guest character, prior to Robert Llewellyn taking over in series III, and he had also played Talkie Toaster in the series IV episode "White Hole". In the end, Llewellyn impersonated the accent. Ross would later return to the series reprising his role of Talkie in the Series XII episode "Mechocracy" aired in 2017.

One of the most difficult scenes to film was the dance between The Cat and Blue Midget. The entire sequence was filmed first with green screen backdrop; it was then edited with no effects, so that Blue Midget would be added to match the movements. The scene marked the return of Blue Midget after last being seen in series III episode "Bodyswap". In terms of true-series continuity, this marks the first appearance of the new CGI re-design of the ship.

References

External links

 "Back in the Red: Part 1", "Part 2", "Part 3" @ BBC Online
 "Back in the Red: Part 1", "Part 2", 
 Series VIII episode guide at www.reddwarf.co.uk

Red Dwarf VIII episodes
1999 British television episodes
Fiction about resurrection